Rajkumar Baisla Gurjar also known as Rajkumar Bansal (born 1966) is an Indian freestyle wrestler. In August 2011, he received the Dhyan Chand Award – India's highest honour for lifetimes Achievements and he also got Yash bharti award (2014), Railways minister award (2013) and Laxman award (2021) by Yogi adityanath. He is the first gurjar to receive this award.
Now he is incharge of Kishanganj Railways akhada and Coach of Olympian  and international Wrestlers such as Sushil Kumar, Sakshi Malik, Yogeshwar Dutt, Bajrang Punia and Phogat sisters Under Northern Railways Training Camps.He is also sport officer for Northern Railways

Biography and achievements

Mewla Bhatti is a village in Loni tehsil of Ghaziabad.  This village is known for mutual gang war.  The village was dominated by musclemen in the 90s.  Dabangas like Mahendra Fauji and Satveer Gurjar used to run their own gangs in western Uttar Pradesh.  In the same gang-war, dozens of people, including Mahendra Fauji Baisla, Satveer Gurjar, were killed.  Discussions of this bloody gang-war were all over the country.  Due to which a film was made, which was named Zila Ghaziabad, during which the youth of this village were maintaining the status Symbol, while there was a red one in the village who tied a loincloth and sweated the arena.  Today, due to this arena, the wrestler has received the Laxman Award from Uttar Pradesh Chief Minister Yogi Adityanath.  His name is Rajkumar Baisla.  On Uttar Pradesh Day 2021, Chief Minister Yogi Adityanath also handed over a cheque for the prize money of 3 lakh 11000 to Baisla.

Rajkumar Baisla is currently working as a manager and coach at the Indian Railway Academy, New Delhi.  Rajkumar Baisla is a wrestler who has made the country proud by winning medals not only in national but Commonwealth games, Asian Games and South Asian Games. Baisla has illuminated the name of Uttar Pradesh by winning 7 gold medals at the national and junior national level.  While also won the Biggest Minister Award of the Indian Railways.  Coach Rajkumar brightened the name of India by winning in not only Asia but also in South Asia, Commonwealth and England.  Baisla won silver in 82 kg in Commonwealth Games, gold in 74 kg in Asian and South Asian Games. In view of his achievements, the state government has given him this year's Laxman Award.

In the Olympic games, from 1985 to 1994, Baisla has been consistently Represented india and Sometimes he got 4th and 5th positions.  It is also necessary to mention here that Rajkumar Baisla was given the contribution of Major Dhyan Chand (2011) on behalf of the Government of India and Yash Bharti (2014) on behalf of the Government of Uttar Pradesh for increasing the value of the state.  In 2013, the Railways has also won an important Minister Award.  Baisla says that this honor is very important for him.  This has increased their enthusiasm about the game.  After this, he will now start an academy to promote local talent in his village.

References

1960 births
Living people
Date of birth missing (living people)